Transformer is a 2017 Canadian documentary film directed by Michael Del Monte, featuring competitive bodybuilder Janae Kroc coping with both the physical and social processes of gender transition after coming out as a trans woman.

Release and awards
The film premiered at the 2017 Austin Film Festival, where it won the audience prize and feature documentary award.
 It subsequently screened at the 2018 Hot Docs Canadian International Documentary Festival, where it won both Audience Award categories, the juried award for best Canadian documentary and the emerging Canadian filmmaker award, then at the 2018 Queer North Film Festival, where it won the audience award for best transgender film.

The film was distributed in Canada primarily as a television film on the Canadian Broadcasting Corporation's Documentary Channel, with international theatrical distribution by Gravitas Ventures.

Graham Withers received a Canadian Screen Award nomination for Best Editing in a Documentary at the 7th Canadian Screen Awards.

References

External links
 

2017 films
2017 LGBT-related films
Canadian sports documentary films
Canadian LGBT-related films
Transgender-related documentary films
Documentary films about LGBT sportspeople
2010s English-language films
2010s Canadian films